Maximiliano Ré (born 23 March 1987) is an Argentine-Italian footballer.

Biography
Re started his career at hometown club Rosario Central. In August 2007, he was signed by Siena, where he played at Primavera Team, and call-up to Torneo di Viareggio 2008.

In February 2009, he was loaned to Colligiana. His teammate Rodrigo De Lazzari also moved to the club on free transfer.

In summer 2009, he went to Spanish regional league side UD Ibiza-Eivissa.
In the winter transfer 2010 signing for the CD Izarra though he plays a few minutes.

References

External links
 
 

Argentine footballers
Argentine expatriate footballers
Rosario Central footballers
A.C.N. Siena 1904 players
A.S.D. Olimpia Colligiana players
CD Izarra footballers
Association football midfielders
Expatriate footballers in Italy
Expatriate footballers in Spain
Argentine expatriate sportspeople in Italy
Argentine expatriate sportspeople in Spain
Argentine people of Italian descent
Footballers from Rosario, Santa Fe
1987 births
Living people